The chakhe (Lao: ຈະເຂ້, also spelled jakhe or ja-khe), or krapeu (also called takhe, takhe, takkhe or charakhe), is a fretted floor zither or lute with three strings used in Thai and Khmer music. The Thai and the Khmer instrument are virtually identical.

It is made of hardwood in a stylized crocodile shape and is approximately 20 cm high and 130–132 cm long. The "head" portion is 52 cm long, 28 cm wide and 9–12 cm deep; the "tail" portion 81 cm long and 11.5 cm wide. It has eleven (chakhe) or twelve (krapeu) raised frets made of bamboo, ivory, bone or wood, graduated between 2 and 3.5 cm in height, which are affixed to the fretboard with wax or glue. Its highest two strings are made of silk yarn, catgut or nylon while the lowest is made of metal. They are tuned C–G–c. The instrument is usually supported by three or five legs.

The player—sitting beside the instrument—uses his or her left hand on the fretboard while plucking the string with his right hand with a 5- to 6-cm long, tapered plectrum made from ivory, bone or water buffalo horn, which is tied to the player's index finger, and bracing it with the thumb and index finger. The instrument has a buzzing sound because the strings are raised just off the flat bridge by a sliver of bamboo or other thin material such as plastic.

In Thai music, the chakhe is part of the Mahori ensemble, in Khmer music, the krapeu is part of the equivalent Mohori. Among the Khmer classical instruments, the takhe is probably the most recently introduced; it is assumed to be adopted from Thai music. It is used for wedding music, A-yai, and Chapei music as well as modern music.

The name chakhe is derived from chorakhe, meaning "crocodile". The word krapeu means "alligator" or "crocodile" in the Khmer language, as well.

Chakhe and krapeu are also related to the Myanmar/Mon mi gyaung (kyam), which has however realistic zoological features and not just the abstract form of a crocodile. More distantly, they are also related to the Indian Veena.

See also
Mi gyaung

References

External links
Sound sample
Krapeu page
Jakhe page

Cambodian musical instruments
Thai musical instruments
Zithers